The 2002 Mercedes-Benz Cup was a men's tennis tournament played on outdoor hard courts at the Los Angeles Tennis Center in Los Angeles, California in the United States and was part of the International Series of the 2002 ATP Tour. The tournament ran from July 22 through July 28, 2002. Second-seeded and defending champion Andre Agassi won the singles title.

Finals

Singles

 Andre Agassi defeated  Jan-Michael Gambill 6–2, 6–4
 It was Agassi's 4th title of the year and the 54th of his career.

Doubles

 Sébastien Grosjean /  Nicolas Kiefer defeated  Justin Gimelstob /  Michaël Llodra 6–4, 6–4
 It was Grosjean's 1st title of the year and the 4th of his career. It was Kiefer's only title of the year and the 8th of his career.

References

Mercedes-Benz Cup
Los Angeles Open (tennis)
Mercedes-Benz Cup
Mercedes-Benz Cup
Mercedes-Benz Cup